Henrietta Mariana "Marianne" Charlotta Koskull (19 February 1785, in Växjö –  30 March 1841, in Stockholm) was a Swedish noble and lady-in-waiting, known as the royal mistress of King Charles XIII of Sweden and King Charles XIV John of Sweden.

Life

Mariana, or Marianne as she was often called at the French-influenced court, was born to Baron Gustaf Fredrik Koskull (a member of the aristocratic Koskull family) and Anna Charlotta Gjelstrup. Although the family belonged to the nobility, they were poor, which was illustrated by the fact that her sister Constance Koskull (nicknamed 'Stansa') was forced to break her engagement to marry Christian Fredrik Damm, with whom she was in love, and marry the rich merchant John Hall the Younger for money instead.  Reportedly, her father said to her: "Are you so stupid my Stansa!? Keep loving your Fredrik, but marry  Hall – one does not prevent the other! We shall soon be reduced to beggary if you refuse Hall."

Mariana Koskull was given a good education and, thanks to her rank, was appointed hovfröken (maid-of-honour) to queen Charlotte, thus acquiring one of few professions socially acceptable for a noblewoman. She became a social success at court, where she was admired for her musicality and her talent as an actress. She was a good harp player, and often played the main part in the amateur theatre at court at special occasions and festivities, during which she was described as having as much talent as a professional actress.

On 28 January 1811, Koskull participated to great acclaim in an amateur performance of The Barber of Seville, which was given by members of the nobility at the Royal Palace in honor of the king's name day and the arrival of the crown princess, during which she played the role of Rosina opposite Baron Gustaf Löwenhielm as Bartholo, Count Axel Mörner as Bazile, Count Carl Löwenhielm as Figaro and Count Gustaf Adolf Sparre as Alzade, followed by a ballet also performed by members of the court nobility.

Royal mistress

Koskull was pointed out and known as the mistress of King Charles XIII as well as the mistress to his adopted successor, King Charles XIV John (crowned 1818). Koskull and Charles John were said to have had a secret child together, but this is unconfirmed.

After the succession of Charles XIII in 1809, Koskull was talked about as the mistress of the king. Queen Charlotte, however, brushed this aside with the comment that the king may have been infatuated with Koskull but was too decrepit to do anything about it. In parallel to being talked about as the lover of Charles XIII, Mariana Koskull was also pointed out as the lover of the king's adopted son and heir, Crown Prince Charles John, who arrived in Sweden in 1810. The affair reportedly started after Charles John's wife Désirée Clary left Sweden for France in 1811, and after the crown prince had first unsuccessfully courted Koskull's cousin Aurora Wilhelmina Brahe. The affair was evidently hidden for four years before being exposed, as Queen Charlotte commented in her famous journal that Koskull and Charles John had begun the affair the year of the departure of the crown princess to Paris in 1811, but that it was not exposed until the spring of 1815, when she the queen herself became certain of it.   

In June 1815, Queen Charlotte summarized the relationship between Mariana Koskull, Charles XIII, Crown Prince and Prince Oscar in her journal: 

In 1816, when the crown princess was rumored to be returning to Sweden (which ultimately did not occur), the Queen remarked that the crown prince did not wish her return because of his relationship with Koskull.

During Koskull's parallel affair with the king and the crown prince, Mariana Koskull had a painting placed in one of the king's salons with a different image on each side, which was used to signal to the crown prince.  One side of the painting showed Koskull painted as one of the muses (Terpsichore), and the other side showed an image of a fortune teller. Reportedly, when the painting was turned with the image of the fortune teller visible, it was a sign to the crown prince that that day was her day with the king; if it showed the image of the muse, then she would spend the day with the crown prince.

Mariana Koskull reportedly used her influence with both Charles XIII and Charles John (who was acting regent during the reign of Charles XIII) to promote relatives and proteges with lucrative offices. In January 1817, Queen Charlotte noted in her journal: 

At court, she was accused of abusing her influence over the crown prince to attain a promotion to Captain lieutenant of the royal guard for her brother Gustaf Adolf Koskull, who were ill-reputed at court as well as with his own relatives, the Brahe family, for being a rake. 

An anecdote was told about Koskull's influence upon Charles XIII:

Her position made her courted by supplicants but also other influential people: statesman count Johan Christopher Toll courted her influence, not only for being a royal mistress, but also for being related to countess Aurora Wilhelmina Brahe, and in turn the well liked stepmother of the royal favorite Magnus Brahe (1790–1844).

In 1818, Charles XIII died and Charles XIV John became king. During the years between the death of Queen Charlotte in 1818 and the arrival of Queen Desiree and Crown Princess Josephine in 1823 (and with Princess Sophia Albertina of Sweden preferring to live in retirement due to her age) there was no female royalty at court. Mariana Koskull was in effect the leading lady of the court and the official mistress of the king, who reportedly  preferred to live "the life of a rich private citizen" in her company and did not uphold much of a court life.  During this period, she lived in a grand apartment in the Royal Palace.  Koskull had her sister Constance Koskull, who had been ostracized from the aristocracy because she had abandoned her husband and lived openly with a lover, formally presented at court, all noblewomen who were asked simulated illness until the last one, the lady-in-waiting countess Ruth, finally agreed to perform the presentation, and "fainted immediately afterwards."

Later life

In 1823, when queen Desiree returned to Sweden in the company of the new crown princess after eleven years of absence, the King appointed his mistress Mariana Koskull, as well as the crown prince's mistress Jacquette Löwenhielm, as ladies-in-waiting to the queen.  Koskull was appointed to  the position of kammarfröken (senior maid of honour), the highest post possible for an unmarried noblewoman of the royal household, which she kept until her death.  The queen seldom had any influence over whom was appointed to her household, but the position of lady-in-waiting did not necessarily force her to spend time with any lady-in-waiting she disliked, and the position gave Mariana Koskull a high income and a legitimate reason to remain at court and live a comfortable life.   

After the queen and the crown princess were installed, the formal representational court life was revived in Sweden and Mariana Koskoll was no longer an official mistress of the king, and it is noted that she moved out of her grand apartments in the Royal Palace, which illustrated her position as an official mistress, to a more modest one befitting a normal lady-in-waiting.  Whether the relationship between Mariana Koskull and Charles XIV John actually discontinued, or if it was simply conducted discreetly after this, is not known, but she is no longer mentioned in the position as his mistress after 1823. 

Koskull died unmarried and childless.

References 

 Lars Elgklou: Familjen Bernadotte. En kunglig släktkrönika
 Hedvig Elisabeth Charlottas dagbok IX, Stockholm, P.A. Norstedt & Söners förlag, 412070, (1942)
 Lars Elgklou (1978). Bernadotte. Historien - eller historier - om en familj.. Stockholm: Askild & Kärnekull Förlag AB

Mistresses of Charles XIII
Swedish nobility
1785 births
1841 deaths
Swedish ladies-in-waiting
Mariana